Ontario provincial spending, 2004, comprises the revenues and expenditures of the Government of Ontario in the 2004-2005 fiscal year (April 1, 2004 to March 31, 2005).  All figures below are in Canadian dollars, and are reported as prepared by the Ministry of Finance (Ontario), in the annual Public Accounts of Ontario.  The ±% column below is relative to the last fiscal year of 03-04, as noted in Ontario provincial spending, 2003.

Revenues

Expenses

References

See also
 Canadian federal spending, 2004

2004 in Ontario
Government finances in Canada
Political history of Ontario